Lichelle Jade Clarke (born 26 February 1986) is an Australian Paralympic swimmer.  She was born in Mount Waverley, Victoria.  At the 2004 Athens Games, she won a silver medal in the Women's 400 m Freestyle S8 event and a bronze medal in the Women's 4x100 m Freestyle 34 pts event with her teammates.

At the 2006 Commonwealth Games in Melbourne, she finished 7th in the Women's 100m Freestyle EAD final. She was an Australian Institute of Sport paralympic swimming scholarship holder from 2003 to 2006. She swam for the Warragul Water Warriors and was a member of the Gippsland Sports Academy.

References

External links
 
 
 

Female Paralympic swimmers of Australia
Commonwealth Games competitors for Australia
Swimmers at the 2004 Summer Paralympics
Swimmers at the 2006 Commonwealth Games
Paralympic silver medalists for Australia
Paralympic bronze medalists for Australia
Australian Institute of Sport Paralympic swimmers
1986 births
Living people
Medalists at the 2004 Summer Paralympics
Paralympic medalists in swimming
Australian female freestyle swimmers
S8-classified Paralympic swimmers
People from Mount Waverley, Victoria
Swimmers from Melbourne
Sportswomen from Victoria (Australia)